Deltana is a census-designated place (CDP) in Southeast Fairbanks Census Area, Alaska, United States. At the 2020 census the population was 2,359, up from 2,251 in 2010. Native inhabitants are Tanana Athabaskans.

History

In 1904, the U.S. Army Signal Corps built the McCarty Telegraph station on a site near a roadhouse established the previous year at the confluence of the Tanana and Delta rivers. The Chisana gold strike of 1913 brought many hopeful prospectors to the area. In the 1920s, many American Bison were brought to the area, and in 1927 the name was changed to Buffalo Center.

In 1942, five miles south of Deltana, Fort Greely was constructed. Beef cattle were shipped during the 1950s, and during the 1970s the local economy was given another boost with the completion of the trans-Alaska pipeline.

In 1980,  of land were set aside as the Delta Bison Range to confine the bison and separate the expanding herd from local farmland.

Geography
Deltana is located at  (63.963825, -145.408931).

Demographics

Deltana first appeared on the 2000 U.S. Census as a census-designated place (CDP).

As of the census of 2000, there were 1,570 people, 539 households, and 417 families residing in the CDP.  The population density was 2.8 people per square mile (1.1/km2).  There were 669 housing units at an average density of 1.2/sq mi (0.5/km2).  The racial makeup of the CDP was 91.6% White, 1.2% Black or African American, 0.9% Native American, 1.1% Asian, 0.4% from other races, and 4.8% from two or more races.  1.2% of the population were Hispanic or Latino of any race.

Deltana has the second highest percentage of residents having been born in Ukraine in the United States at 8.4%, with an even higher total percentage of residents being Ukrainians or having Ukrainian ancestry.

There were 539 households, out of which 36.5% had children under the age of 18 living with them, 69.2% were married couples living together, 5.0% had a female householder with no husband present, and 22.6% were non-families. 19.1% of all households were made up of individuals, and 6.1% had someone living alone who was 65 years of age or older.  The average household size was 2.87 and the average family size was 3.30.

In the CDP, the population was spread out, with 31.4% under the age of 18, 6.9% from 18 to 24, 23.5% from 25 to 44, 30.9% from 45 to 64, and 7.3% who were 65 years of age or older.  The median age was 39 years. For every 100 females, there were 107.4 males.  For every 100 females age 18 and over, there were 105.9 males.

Income
The median income for a household in the CDP was $50,066, and the median income for a family was $53,021. Males had a median income of $42,500 versus $31,042 for females. The per capita income for the CDP was $18,446.  About 12.1% of families and 15.1% of the population were below the poverty line, including 19.9% of those under age 18 and 0.9% of those age 65 or over.

References

Census-designated places in Southeast Fairbanks Census Area, Alaska
Census-designated places in Alaska
Tanana Athabaskans
Ukrainian communities in the United States
Census-designated places in Unorganized Borough, Alaska